Huai Nam Dang National Park is a national park in Thailand's Mae Hong Son and Chiang Mai Provinces. This mountainous park features scenic mountain viewpoints, waterfalls, and hot springs.

Geography
The park's streams are the source for rivers including the Pai and Taeng.

Climate

History
A survey of the Huai Nam Dang area was set up in December 1987. Later on 14 August 1995 Hui Nam Dang National Park, covers Chiang Dao, Mae Taeng and Mai Pai forests, with an area of 782,575 rai ~  has been declared the 81st national park.

Attractions
Doi Chang and Doi Kiew Lom mountains offer popular viewpoints of neighbouring mountains and a "sea of fog" effect on winter mornings. Mae Yen is another year-round waterfall. Park hot springs include Pong Dueat, consisting of three or four large pools, and Tha Pai in the Pai District section of the park.

Flora
The park is home to numerous forest types, such as evergreen, deciduous and dipterocarp forest.
Evergreen forest include:

Deciduous forest include:

Dipterocarp forest include:

Fauna
Mammel sorts include:

Reptile  sorts include:

Birds of which species of passerines include:

Species of non-passerines include:

Gallery

See also
List of national parks of Thailand
List of Protected Areas Regional Offices of Thailand

References

External links

 National Parks of Thailand: Huai Nam Dang National Park official website

National parks of Thailand
Geography of Chiang Mai province
Tourist attractions in Chiang Mai province
Geography of Mae Hong Son province
Tourist attractions in Mae Hong Son province